The interleukin-23 receptor is a type I cytokine receptor. It is encoded in human by the IL23R gene. In complex with the interleukin-12 receptor β1 subunit (IL-12Rβ1), it is activated by the cytokine interleukin 23 (IL-23). The IL23R mRNA is 2.8 kilobases in length and includes 12 exons. The translated protein contains 629 amino acids; it is a type I penetrating protein and includes a signal peptide, an N-terminal fibronectin III-like domain and an intracellular part that contains three potential tyrosine phosphorylation domains. There are 24 IL23R splice variants in mitogen-activated lymphocytes. IL23R includes some single-nucleotide polymorphisms in the region encoding the domain that binds IL-23, which may lead to differences between people in Th17 activation. There is also a variant of IL-23R that consists of just the extracellular part and is known as soluble IL-23R. This form can compete with the membrane-bound form to bind IL-23, modulating the Th17 immune response and regulation of inflammation and immune function.

Function 

The protein encoded by this gene is a subunit of the receptor for IL-23. This protein pairs with the receptor molecule IL-12Rβ1 (IL12RB1), together forming the IL-23 receptor complex,  and both are required for IL-23 signaling. This protein associates constitutively with Janus kinase 2 (JAK2) and also binds to transcription activator STAT3 in a ligand-dependent manner.

Clinical significance 
Three variants in the IL23R gene have been shown to protect against Crohn's disease and ulcerative colitis.
The effect of IL-23R variations present in the population have been studied with an in vitro expression model system.

Model organisms
A conditional knockout mouse line called Il23rtm2a(EUCOMM)Wtsi was generated at the Wellcome Trust Sanger Institute. Male and female animals underwent a standardized phenotypic screen to determine the effects of deletion. In-depth immunological phenotyping was also undertaken.

References

Further reading

External links 
 

Type I cytokine receptors